Boule de Suif, translated variously as Dumpling, Butterball, Ball of Fat, or Ball of Lard, is a famous short story by the late 19th-century French writer Guy de Maupassant, first published on 15/16 April 1880. It is arguably his most famous short story and is the title story for his collection on the Franco-Prussian War, titled Boule de Suif et Autres Contes de la Guerre (Dumpling and Other Stories of the War).

Plot 
The ten travellers decide for various reasons to leave Rouen and flee to Le Havre in a stagecoach. Sharing the carriage are Boule de Suif or "Butterball" (lit. suet dumpling, also translated as ball of fat), a prostitute whose real name is Elisabeth Rousset; the strict Democrat Cornudet; a shop-owning couple from the petty bourgeoisie, M. and Mme. Loiseau; a wealthy upper-bourgeoisie factory-owner and his wife, M. and Mme. Carré-Lamadon; the Comte and Comtesse of Bréville; and two nuns. Thus, the carriage constitutes a microcosm of French society, representing different parts of the French population during the late 19th century.

Due to the terrible weather, the coach moves very slowly and by midday has only covered a few miles. The occupants initially snub Boule de Suif, but their attitudes change when she produces a picnic basket full of lovely food and offers to share its contents with the hungry travellers.

At the village of Tôtes, the carriage stops at the local coaching inn, and the occupants, hearing a German voice, realise they have blundered into Prussian-held territory. A Prussian officer detains the party at the inn indefinitely without telling them why. Over the next two days, the travellers become increasingly impatient, and are finally told by Boule de Suif that they are being detained until she agrees to sleep with the officer. She is repeatedly called before the officer, and always returns in a heightened state of agitation. Initially, the travellers support her and are furious at the officer's arrogance, but their indignation soon disappears as they grow angry at Boule de Suif for not sleeping with the officer so that they can leave. Over the course of the next two days, the travelers use various examples of logic and morality to convince her it is the right thing to do; she finally gives in and sleeps with the officer, who allows them to leave the next morning.

As they continue on their way to Le Havre, these "representatives of Virtue" ignore Boule de Suif and turn to polite topics of conversation, glancing scathingly at the young woman while refusing to even acknowledge her, and refusing to share their food with her the way that she did with them earlier. As the coach travels on into the night, Cornudet starts whistling the Marseillaise which sours the mood of everyone in the coach, and all the while Boule de Suif, bemoaning her lost dignity, can hardly repress her sobs.

Themes 

The main theme focuses on French resistance to the German occupiers during the war. During the first half of the story, the narrator explains the background of each of the occupants, with particular emphasis on the petty bourgeois Democrat, Cornudet, who is said to have devised all manner of defences for Rouen. The overriding theme is that while the occupants talk a great deal about resisting the invaders, they are ultimately running away in a cowardly fashion rather than staying in the town. The first section of the story also establishes that the most fiercely patriotic passenger is Boule de Suif herself, an insignificant and unpopular character in Rouen, while the aristocrats and bourgeois are portrayed as happier to betray their country in order to end the war and return to their comfortable lives. In that respect, Maupassant praises the patriotic fervour of the inhabitants of the provinces, in sharp contrast to other French writers of the period who accused provincial French citizens of being apathetic and cowardly.

Boule de Suif's personal resistance grows throughout the story; when the coach is stopped by the Germans at the village of Tôtes, the other passengers meekly follow the officer's orders while Boule de Suif refuses to co-operate as easily. Boule de Suif's resistance to the officer's sexual advances again shows her patriotism, something which is noticed by the other characters, who comment that although it is Boule de Suif's job to sleep with men, she patriotically refuses to allow herself to be conquered by the German officer.

Like Maupassant's other short stories on the Franco-Prussian War, he tends to stereotype the German soldiers. The troops holding Rouen are hinted at as dull and slow-witted. The German officer at the inn is portrayed in the same way as Maupassant depicts German officers throughout his stories; the officer is shown as being arrogant, morally dubious, and unfeeling. The description of the officer in his room at the inn suggests that he is pointlessly destructive, uncultured, and boorish. At the same time, there are passages that describe how German troops get about their daily life and long to return home to their own families.

The theme of class barrier is also tackled in the story. Throughout the story, Maupassant portrays the inhabitants of the coach in various disparaging ways. The aristocratic Comte and Comtesse are revealed to be weak and cowardly in spite of their position as the chief dignitaries of Rouen. The manufacturer and his wife are constantly portrayed as greedy and materialistic, and the manufacturer's wife in particular is always shown to be shocked whenever her husband spends any money.

The petit bourgeois wine-seller and his wife are shown as corrupt and morally reprehensible, the most likely of the party to betray their country simply to return to a life of greed in peace. The two nuns travelling in the coach are at first portrayed as quiet and subservient to God, and later show themselves as fiery, patriotic, and doing more for their country than the other occupants of the coach: the nuns claim to be travelling to a military hospital to treat wounded French soldiers, thus offering the deciding argument towards persuading Boule de Suif to abandon her resistance. The narrator offers to excuse their crafty argumentation as accidental stupidity, but the nuns' base behavior as they fail to share food with the courtesan raises a question mark if not necessarily on their story then on their altruistic motivation. Cornudet is repeatedly shown as a man who is little more than a drunken, lecherous, and cowardly man who is not prepared to stand up for his vicious anti-German beliefs when the time comes. In contrast to all of these is Boule de Suif herself, revealed to be the most fiercely patriotic, kind-hearted, and morally admirable character, which Maupassant contrasts with the hypocrisy and snobbery of the other travellers.

Despite being shunned by the other occupants at first, she gladly shares her picnic basket with the hungry occupants of the coach, but at the end of the novel, when she has no food for the other half of the journey, the coach's other occupants refuse to share their food with her, an ingratitude made even worse by the fact that it was Boule de Suif's personal sacrifice that allowed them to leave. Her self-sacrifice in sleeping with the German officer underlines her personal courage and the blind hypocrisy of the other travellers; the travellers go to great lengths to persuade Boule de Suif to sleep with the officer in order that he will let the coach continue its journey, and the travellers fill Boule de Suif's head with arguments, arguing that it is for the good of the country; that it is not morally wrong to sleep with the officer to let the travellers leave; and that the longer she waits, the more young French soldiers will die as the nuns are not there to look after them.

When Boule de Suif gives in and sleeps with the officer, the rest of the travellers throw a party without her, and when the coach finally leaves the next morning, they treat her with utter disgust and contempt although she has freed them and they had induced her to lose her dignity.

Publication history 
It was first published in 1880 in Les Soirées de Médan, a collection of Naturalist short stories dealing with the Franco-Prussian war.

Adaptations
The plot has often been adapted, in whole or in part, for films and other media:
 In 1928 in the US, a silent film version was The Woman Disputed by Henry King & Sam Taylor.
 In 1932, also in the US, Shanghai Express by Josef von Sternberg, starring Marlene Dietrich, was loosely based on the story, with significant changes.
 In 1934, the Moscow Art Players, under the auspices of the Soviet studio Mosfilm, produced a silent film version of "Boule de Suif" called Pyshka (Dumpling). It was adapted and directed by Mikhail Romm and starred Galina Sergeyеva. The film was re-released by Mosfilm in 1955 with a narration and sound effects added to it, but remained unknown outside of Russia until its belated premiere in New York in 1958. New York Times reviewer Howard Thompson describes the film as "little more than a musty curio" but with a storyline that "is still pretty wonderful as a yarn and a scathing commentary on hypocrisy and selfishness"
 In 1935 in Japan, Kenji Mizoguchi made Maria no Oyuki (Oyuki the Virgin). 
 Of his 1939 U.S.A film Stagecoach, John Ford said it was "really 'Boule de Suif'" and McBride attributes the "film's sharp social criticism" to its being "more deeply influence[d] by Maupassant" than by Ernest Haycox's 1937 short story "The Stage to Lordsburg" that established the framework of the film itself.
In 1940 Irish playwright Lennox Robinson adapted the story for the stage under the name Roly Poly. The production premiered at the Gate Theatre in November 1940. The production was directed by Hilton Edwards.
 In 1943 in the US, a remake of Shanghai Express by Ralph Murphy was called Night Plane from Chungking.
 In 1944 Hollywood director Robert Wise undertook a project for RKO Radio Pictures titled Mademoiselle Fifi, based on two of Maupassant's short stories, "Boule de Suif" and the 1882 "Mademoiselle Fifi". This version starred Simone Simon as Elizabeth Bousset, who is the "little laundress" of the short story "Mademoiselle Fifi" rather than the prostitute of "Boule de Suif", and the dandified and lecherous lieutenant is played by Kurt Kreuger.
 In 1944 the Mexican film The Escape directed by Norman Foster was set during the French Intervention in Mexico. 
 In 1945 a French film version was released as Boule de Suif, released in the US in 1947 as Angel and Sinner. This film directed by Christian-Jaque, based on a screenplay by Henri Jeanson and starring Micheline Presle and Louis Salou, also imported much of the character of the lecherous Prussian soldier from the Maupassant story "Mademoiselle Fifi".
 In 1951 Peking Express by William Dieterle was a U.S.A remake of "Night Plane from Chungking".
 The 1959 episode, "Lady on the Stagecoach" from the American television series Have Gun Will Travel, with Richard Boone as Paladin, was based on Boule de Suif. The half-hour episode transposed the scene from France to the Western US in 1868. In this version, the young woman was the daughter of an Apache chief. Her suitor was the leader of an outlaw gang. The outlaw is foiled in his attempt to abduct the woman by Paladin. In an added twist, the young woman forgives the outlaw leader for trying to abduct her and tells Paladin to let him go, because, she says, "He said he had respect for me."
 In 1959 Anatole Litvak's The Journey with Deborah Kerr and Yul Brynner borrowed heavily from the plot device of a group of travellers detained by an authoritarian foreign officer with a romantic interest in an attractive passenger.
 In July 2006, the opera The Greater Good, or The Passion of Boule de Suif opened as a part of the Glimmerglass Opera Festival in Cooperstown, New York. The opera was composed by Stephen Hartke based on a libretto by Phillip Littell and directed by David Schweizer.
 In 2007, Dr. Kausar Mahmood translated Boule de Suif and many other stories into the Urdu language under the title of " Momi Gainde". It was published by Takhleeqat,  Mozang Road,  Lahore.
 In 2009, it was adapted and drawn by Li-An as a French-language graphic novel and released by Delcourt Press. In an interview, Li-An noted that one reason Boule de Suif was chosen for the Delcourt "Ex Libris" collection was that it had been "more or less at the base of John Ford's Stagecoach" and that the original short story offered a timeless message about human nature and how the "value of a person does not depend on social status" but rather on one's own personality.

Notes

External links

 
 Boule de Suif at Project Gutenberg
 
 
 Boule de Suif (audiobook)
 Boule de Suif (original French version) with 1,100+ English annotations at Tailored Texts

1880 short stories
Short stories by Guy de Maupassant
Prostitution in literature
Franco-Prussian War fiction
Short stories adapted into films